Louis Huybrechts (21 February 1875 – 1963) was a Belgian sailor. He won the Silver medal in the  6m class in the 1908 Summer Olympics in London along with Léon Huybrechts and Henri Weewauters.

References

1875 births
1963 deaths
Belgian male sailors (sport)
Sailors at the 1908 Summer Olympics – 6 Metre
Olympic sailors of Belgium
Olympic silver medalists for Belgium
Olympic medalists in sailing
Medalists at the 1908 Summer Olympics